Madelyn Renee Cline (born December 21, 1997) is an American actress and model. She is known for her roles as Sarah Cameron on the Netflix teen drama series Outer Banks (2020–present) and as Whiskey in Rian Johnson's mystery film Glass Onion: A Knives Out Mystery (2022).

Early life
Cline was born on December 21, 1997, to estate agent Pam and engineer Mark and was raised in Goose Creek, South Carolina, near Charleston. She briefly was enrolled in college at Coastal Carolina University, but dropped out and moved to Los Angeles to further pursue acting. She was a part of a Chuck E. Cheese commercial when she was a child.

Career
Cline spent some of her early summers in New York City working on television commercials for T-Mobile, Next clothing and Sunny D. She soon got small roles such as Chloe in Boy Erased and Taylor Watts in Vice Principals. She also had small recurring roles in The Originals and Stranger Things.

In 2018, Cline was cast as Sarah Elizabeth Cameron on the Netflix mystery drama Outer Banks, the first season of which was released on April 15, 2020. Considered her breakout role, the show received positive reviews and a second season which premiered in July 2021. In June 2021, she joined the cast of Glass Onion: A Knives Out Mystery. The third season of Outer Banks, in which Cline reprises her role of Sarah Cameron, premiered on Netflix on February 23, 2023. On February 18, 2023 Cline appeared at Poguelandia, the show's first-ever fan music festival, where it was announced that Outer Banks would return for a fourth season.

Personal life
In June 2020, Cline announced she was in a relationship with her Outer Banks co-star Chase Stokes. In October 2021, the couple announced they had split.

Cline revealed that she struggled with an unspecified eating disorder and her body image as a teenager.

Filmography

References

External links
 

1997 births
Living people
21st-century American actresses
Actresses from Charleston, South Carolina
American web series actresses
People from Goose Creek, South Carolina